was a Japanese professional Grand Prix motorcycle road racer. Ito began his Grand Prix career in 1960, although he was a Factory Yamaha rider as far back as 1957  where the Yamaha YD-A & YD-B 250cc machines were so devastating in the Asama highlands race, where Yamaha took the first 3 places with Matsuko on a YD-A taking the honors. Ito himself could have easily won the race and had set the fastest lap, but his YD-A motorcycle seized and cost him the race. The machines were later modified for the 1958 Catalina GP in States with smaller fuel tanks taken from the YA 125 machines, high pipes and high footpegs. Ito was the Star rider of the team and the only Japanese rider alongside four local American riders. Ito finished 6th, even after an unscheduled pit stop for a fouled plug. He enjoyed his best season in 1963 when he won the 250cc Belgian Grand Prix and finished the season in third place in the 250cc world championship, behind Jim Redman and Tarquinio Provini.

Motorcycle Grand Prix results 

(key) (Races in bold indicate pole position; races in italics indicate fastest lap)

References 

1939 births
1991 deaths
Japanese motorcycle racers
250cc World Championship riders
500cc World Championship riders
Isle of Man TT riders